Coweta County  is a county located in the west central portion of the U.S. state of Georgia. It is part of Metro Atlanta. As of the 2020 census, the population was 146,158. The county seat is Newnan.

Coweta County is included in the Atlanta-Sandy Springs-Roswell, GA Metropolitan Statistical Area.

History 
The land for Lee, Muscogee, Troup, Coweta and Carroll counties was ceded by the Creek people in the 1825 Treaty of Indian Springs. The counties' boundaries were created by the Georgia General Assembly on June 9, 1826, but they were not named until December 14, 1826. Coweta County was named for the Koweta Indians (a sub-group of the Creek people), who had several towns in and around the present-day county.

In the city of Newnan, on April 23, 1899, a notorious lynching occurred after an African-American man by the name of Sam Hose (born Tom Wilkes) was accused of killing his boss, Alfred Cranford. Hose was tortured and burned alive by a lynch mob of approximately 2,000 citizens of Coweta County.

On August 9, 1882, Aleck Brown was lynched.

Geography
The county is located in the Piedmont region of the state.

The eastern half of Coweta County, from Palmetto southwest to Newnan, then south to Luthersville, is in the Upper Flint River sub-basin of the ACF River Basin (Apalachicola-Chattahoochee-Flint River Basin). The western half is in the Middle Chattahoochee River-Lake Harding sub-basin of the same ACF River Basin.

Major highways

  Interstate 85
  U.S. Route 27 Alternate
  U.S. Route 29
  State Route 14
  State Route 16
  State Route 34
  State Route 34 Bypass
  State Route 41
  State Route 54
  State Route 70
  State Route 74
  State Route 85
  State Route 154
  State Route 403

Adjacent counties
 Fulton County – northeast
 Fayette County – east
 Spalding County –East southeast
 Meriwether County – south
 Troup County – southwest
 Heard County – west
 Carroll County – northwest

Demographics

2000 census
As of the census of 2000, there were 89,215 people, 31,442 households, and 24,713 families living in the county. There were 33,182 housing units at an average density of 75 per square mile (29/km2). The racial makeup of the county was 78.86% White, 17.97% Black or African American, 0.23% Native American, 0.68% Asian, 0.01% Pacific Islander, 1.22% from other races, and 1.02% from two or more races. 3.14% of the population were Hispanic or Latino of any race.

There were 31,442 households, out of which 39.90% had children under the age of 18 living with them, 62.50% were married couples living together, 12.20% had a female householder with no husband present, and 21.40% were non-families. Of all households 17.60% were made up of individuals, and 5.70% had someone living alone who was 65 years of age or older. The average household size was 2.81 and the average family size was 3.17.

In the county, the population was spread out, with 28.70% under the age of 18, 7.60% from 18 to 24, 33.40% from 25 to 44, 21.80% from 45 to 64, and 8.50% who were 65 years of age or older. The median age was 34 years. For every 100 females, there were 98.00 males. For every 100 females age 18 and over, there were 95.40 males.

The median income for a household in the county was $52,706, and the median income for a family was $58,750. Males had a median income of $41,369 versus $27,322 for females. The per capita income for the county was $21,949. About 6.10% of families and 7.80% of the population were below the poverty line, including 9.60% of those under age 18 and 10.50% of those age 65 or over.

2010 census
As of the 2010 United States Census, there were 127,317 people, 45,673 households, and 34,737 families living in the county. The racial makeup of the county was 76.8% white, 18.4% black or African American, 2.2% Asian, 0.4% American Indian, 0.1% Pacific islander, 2.9% from other races, and 2% from two or more races. Those of Hispanic or Latino origin made up 6.8% of the population. In terms of ancestry, 22.2% were Various European, 10.4% were German, 10.4% were Irish, and 9.9% were English.

Of the 45,673 households, 41.0% had children under the age of 18 living with them, 58.5% were married couples living together, 13.1% had a female householder with no husband present, 23.9% were non-families, and 19.6% of all households were made up of individuals. The average household size was 2.77 and the average family size was 3.18. The median age was 36.6 years.

The median income for a household in the county was $61,550 and the median income for a family was $68,469. Males had a median income of $51,658 versus $36,535 for females. The per capita income for the county was $26,161. About 7.7% of families and 10.2% of the population were below the poverty line, including 15.4% of those under age 18 and 7.9% of those age 65 or over.

2020 census

As of the 2020 United States census, there were 146,158 people, 53,640 households, and 37,400 families residing in the county.

Education
The Coweta County School System holds pre-school to grade 12, and consists of nineteen elementary schools, six middle schools  and three high schools. The system has 1,164 full-time teachers and more than 18,389 students. Private schools in the county include The Heritage School and Trinity Christian School.

Mercer University has a Regional Academic Center in Newnan. The center, opened in 2010, offers programs through the university's College of Continuing and Professional Studies. The University of West Georgia has a campus near downtown Newnan on the site of the old Newnan Hospital. This campus offers two undergraduate programs - bachelor of science in nursing and early childhood education.

Newnan is also home to a campus of West Georgia Technical College.

Notable people
 Ellis Gibbs Arnall, governor of Georgia, 1943-1947
 William Yates Atkinson, governor of Georgia, 1894-1896; founded Georgia State College for Women, now Georgia College & State University
 Steve Bedrosian, former Major League baseball player; National League Cy Young Award winner in 1987
 Eric Berry, plays football for Kansas City Chiefs
 Keith Brooking, football player for the Atlanta Falcons and Dallas Cowboys
 Erskine Caldwell, author of the novels Tobacco Road and God's Little Acre
 Lewis Grizzard, newspaper columnist, author and humorist
 Drew Hill, played for the pro football Houston Oilers, Los Angeles Rams and Atlanta Falcons
 Sam Hose, African-American man who was brutally murdered by a lynch mob after accusations of murder, assault and rape
 Alan Jackson, country music singer and musician
 Joe M. Jackson, colonel, U.S. Air Force, Medal of Honor recipient
 Warren Newson, played pro baseball for the Chicago White Sox
 Stephen W. Pless, major, U.S. Marine Corps, Medal of Honor recipient
 Jefferson Randolph "Soapy" Smith, confidence man and crime boss
 Charles Wadsworth, retired director of the Chamber Music Society at the Lincoln Center for the Performing Arts
 Jerome Walton, former Major League baseball player; Rookie of the Year in the National League in 1989
 Rutledge Wood, auto racing analyst and host of Top Gear

Communities

Cities
 Grantville
 Newnan
 Palmetto (partly in Fulton County)
 Senoia

Towns
 Haralson
 Moreland
 Sharpsburg
 Turin

Census-designated place
 East Newnan

Unincorporated communities
 Corinth (partly in Heard County)
 Raymond
 Roscoe
 Sargent
 Thomas Crossroads

Planned town

In the federal government's National Urban Policy and New Community Development Act of 1970, funding was provided for thirteen "new towns" or planned cities throughout the country. One 70,000 acre location was set to be developed in Coweta County and was known as Shenandoah. The project was launched in the early 1970s and was foreclosed on in 1981, when it included 170 families and 108 residential lots.

Government 
The legislative body of Coweta is the Coweta County Commission, which consists of five members elected from numbered districts. The  chairmanship rotates among the members. Coweta County is the only county in Georgia that operates with a rotating chairmanship.

In the General Assembly, it is currently divided between State House district 70, 71, 72 and 132, and is within State Senate district 28 (currently held by Matt Brass). In Congress, it is in the 3rd congressional district, currently represented by Drew Ferguson.

Politics
Coweta is a strongly Republican county, voting 68.4 percent for Donald Trump in 2016 and 69.9 percent for Brian Kemp in 2018.

See also

 National Register of Historic Places listings in Coweta County, Georgia
 B. T. Brown Reservoir
 Murder in Coweta County 
 Murder in Coweta County 1983 film
List of counties in Georgia

References

External links
 Website

 
1826 establishments in Georgia (U.S. state)
Georgia placenames of Native American origin
Coweta
Georgia (U.S. state) counties
Populated places established in 1826